Public life may refer to:

 Politics
 Public Life, a 1984 album by Eddie Schwartz
 Public Life with Randy David, a Filipino public affairs program

See also 
 Social life (disambiguation)
 Public relations